Jerusalem War Cemetery is one of the smallest Second World War cemetery of Commonwealth soldiers in Normandy, France. It is located between Bayeux and Tilly-sur-Seulles, close to the commune of Chouain. The cemetery contains 46 Commonwealth war graves, 1 Czech grave, and 1 unknown British grave.

History
The majority of the soldiers interred in the cemetery were killed in June and July 1944 as the Allies pushed south of Bayeux and then south-west to encircle Caen. Many casualties were involved in fighting around Tilly-sur-Seulles.

The graveyard has two chaplains interred in it; Reverend Cecil James Hawksworth and Reverend Gerard Nesbit and the grave of the youngest British soldier killed in Normandy, 16-year-old Private Jack Banks of the Durham Light Infantry.

This cemetery was the first Commonwealth War Graves Commission cemetery in France to have a Cross of Sacrifice erected.

Location
The cemetery is on the D.6, 9 kilometres south-east of Bayeux, close to the commune of Choain.

Gallery

See also
 American Battle Monuments Commission
 UK National Inventory of War Memorials
 German War Graves Commission
 List of military cemeteries in Normandy

References

Further reading
 Shilleto, Carl, and Tolhurst, Mike (2008). A Traveler’s Guide to D-Day and the Battle of Normandy. Northampton, Mass.: Interlink.

External links
 

British military memorials and cemeteries
Canadian military memorials and cemeteries
Commonwealth War Graves Commission cemeteries in France
Operation Overlord cemeteries
1944 establishments in France
World War II memorials in France